2-Bromohexane is the organobromine compound with the formula CH3CH(Br)(CH2)3CH3.  It is a colorless liquid.  The compound is chiral. Most 2-bromoalkanes are prepared by addition of hydrogen bromide to the 1-alkene.  Markovnikov addition proceeds in the absence of free-radicals, i.e. give the 2-bromo derivatives.

References

Bromoalkanes